The Fully Dressed Tour is a 2016-17 comedy tour by comedian Jim Gaffigan.

Opening Act
Ted Alexandro

Filming and recording
Columbus Ohio September 2016

Setlist
"Weird If You Didn't Clap"
"Belt"
"Seasons"

Tour dates

References

Comedy tours